Nurettin Güven (born March 1957 in Malatya, Turkey) is a Turkish businessman and served as the president of the Malatya-based football club, Malatyaspor.

Alleged activities for MİT
Previously secret documents filed in a court case in Ankara in 2016 named Güven as a hitman working for the Turkish intelligence agency MİT.

Specifically, according to these documents, Güven was the killer in the assassination of the Kurdish trade unionist Mehmet Kaygısız, who was shot dead in a London café in 1994. As of 2016, the murder has not led to a conviction.

Güven has denied involvement in the murder.

See also
 Notable people from Malatya

References

1957 births
Living people
Turkish sportsmen
Turkish sports businesspeople